Cecil Halkyard (17 April 1902 – 1989) was an English footballer who played as a wing half for Rochdale, Reading, Charlton Athletic, and Barrow . He was also on the books of Accrington Stanley and Bury, without playing for the first team.

References

Rochdale A.F.C. players
Reading F.C. players
Charlton Athletic F.C. players
Barrow A.F.C. players
Bury F.C. players
Accrington Stanley F.C. (1891) players
Bacup Borough F.C. players
Connah's Quay & Shotton F.C. players
Rhyl F.C. players
Hyde United F.C. players
Mossley A.F.C. players
Macclesfield Town F.C. players
Footballers from Rochdale
English footballers
1902 births
1989 deaths
Association footballers not categorized by position